Agriomorpha is a genus of flatwings in the damselfly suborder Zygoptera, family Rhipidolestidae.

Species
 Agriomorpha fusca May, 1933
 Agriomorpha xinglongensis (Wilson & Reels, 2001)

References

Zygoptera genera
Calopterygoidea